Colonel Ranveer Singh Jamwal, SM,
VSM** (born 26 December 1975) is an officer of the Indian Army and the first Indian to climb the Seven Summits along with Mount Everest three times. He is a veteran of more than 45 mountaineering expeditions. 
He presently holds two Asian records and three Indian Records in mountaineering.

Early life and education 
Jamwal is a third-generation soldier who was born on 26 December 1975 to Sh Onkar Singh, a Havildar in the Indian Army. His family is from Badhori of Samba District in the Indian state of Jammu and Kashmir.

He completed his primary and secondary education from Army School, Ratnuchak. He cleared the Officer Examination (Army Cadet College) and joined the Indian Military Academy, Dehradun in 1998.

Mountaineering
Ranveer Singh Jamwal completed all four courses in  skiing and mountaineering at High Altitude Warfare School (HAWS), Gulmarg in 2003.

He also did his specialization course in search and rescue from Swiss mountain school Andermatt in 2007.

He has had a varied experience of completing 45 mountaineering expeditions, which includes Mount Everest, the highest peak of the world; Aconcagua, the highest peak of South America; Mount Elbrus, the highest peak of Europe; Mount Kilimanjaro, the highest peak of Africa; Carstensz Pyramid, the highest peak of Australia; and Denali, the highest peak of North America.

In 2022, Col Jamwal made an Indian record by leading the 7 member NIMAS team which cycled 1100 kilometres in all seven north eastern states.

Awards and honours

2010,2012,2017 Chief of Army staff commendation for outstanding achievement.

On 31 August 2013, Jamwal was awarded the highest National award for adventure, the Tenzing Norgay National Adventure Award.

2013 Letter of commendation by Chief of Nepal Army for dynamic Leadership.

He was awarded the Vishisht Seva Medal by the President of India on 15 January 2014. On the same date the next year (15 January 2016) he was awarded a bar to his Vishisht Seva Medal VSM.

He was awarded the Sher-E-Kashmir Sports Award by the Jammu and Kashmir government on 26 January 2016.

He was awarded the Indian Mountaineering Foundation Gold Medal on 18 November 2017 for his achievements in mountaineering. 

2018 Gold Medal for Excellence in mountaineering by Indian Mountaineering foundation. 

2019:  Chief of Army staff commendation for outstanding achievement.

2019: Navratna puraskar by the hospitality industry of India.

2021: Duggar Gaurav adventure award 

2021: Shaurya Samman 

2022:He was awarded the Sena Medal by the government of India on 25 January 2022.

References

1975 births
Living people
Indian summiters of Mount Everest
Indian mountain climbers
Summiters of the Seven Summits
Recipients of the Tenzing Norgay National Adventure Award
Recipients of Indian Mountaineering Foundation's Gold Medal